The West Bengal Power Development Corporation Limited (WBPDCL) is a non-listed company wholly owned and controlled by the Government of West Bengal with the goal to carry on the business of thermal power generation in the state of West Bengal, India. Its thermal power plants are in Kolaghat, Bakreswar, Sagardighi, Santaldih, and Bandel.

The corporation works in tandem with the West Bengal State Electricity Board.
 Kolaghat Thermal Power Station have a total installed capacity of 1260 MW (6x210 MW). 
 Bakreswar Thermal Power Station have a total installed capacity of 1050 MW (5x210 MW).
 Sagardighi Thermal Power Project have a total installed capacity of 1,600 MW (2x300 MW, 2x500 MW).
 Bandel Thermal Power Station have a total installed capacity of 335 MW (2x60, 1x215 MW). Renovation & modernisation of 215MW unit is modified from 210MW.
 Santaldih Thermal Power Station have a total installed capacity of 500 MW (2x250 MW).

References

External links
Official website
Department of Power, Government of West Bengal

Energy in West Bengal
State agencies of West Bengal
State electricity agencies of India
Electric-generation companies of India
Companies based in Kolkata
1985 establishments in West Bengal